Alexander Comyn may refer to: 
Alexander Comyn, Earl of Buchan (died 1289)
Alexander Comyn (died 1308)
Alexander Comyn of Dunphail (died 1330)